A détournement, meaning "rerouting, hijacking" in French, is a technique developed in the 1950s by the Letterist International, and later adapted by the Situationist International (SI), that was defined in the SI's inaugural 1958 journal as "[t]he integration of present or past artistic productions into a superior construction of a milieu. In this sense there can be no situationist painting or music, but only a situationist use of those means. In a more elementary sense, détournement within the old cultural spheres is a method of propaganda, a method which reveals the wearing out and loss of importance of those spheres."  

It has been defined elsewhere as "turning expressions of the capitalist system and its media culture against itself"—as when slogans and logos are turned against their advertisers or the political status quo. 

Détournement was prominently used to set up subversive political pranks, an influential tactic called situationist prank that was reprised by the punk movement in the late 1970s and inspired the culture jamming movement in the late 1980s.

Its opposite is recuperation, in which radical ideas or the social image of people who are viewed negatively are twisted, commodified, and absorbed in a more socially acceptable context.

Definition 
In general it can be defined as a variation on previous work, in which the newly created work has a meaning that is antagonistic or antithetical to the original. The original media work that is détourned must be somewhat familiar to the target audience, so that it can appreciate the opposition of the new message. The artist or commentator making the variation can reuse only some of the characteristic elements of the originating work.

Détournement is similar to satirical parody, but employs more direct reuse or faithful mimicry of the original works rather than constructing a new work which merely alludes strongly to the original.  It may be contrasted with recuperation, in which originally subversive works and ideas are themselves appropriated by mainstream media.

One could view détournement as forming the opposite side of the coin to "recuperation" (where radical ideas and images become safe and commodified), in that images produced by the spectacle get altered and subverted so that rather than supporting the status quo, their meaning becomes changed in order to put across a more radical or oppositional message.

Guy Debord and Gil J. Wolman categorized détourned elements into two types: minor détournements and deceptive détournements. Minor détournements are détournements of elements that in themselves are of no real importance such as a snapshot, a press clipping, an everyday object which draw all their meaning from being placed in a new context. Deceptive détournements are when already significant elements such as a major political or philosophical text, great artwork or work of literature take on new meanings or scope by being placed in a new context.

Examples after the Situationist International 
In the United States, Frank Discussion is widely known for his use of détournement in his works dating from the late 1970s through the present, particularly with the Feederz. The use of détournement by Barbara Kruger familiarised many with the technique, and it was extensively and effectively used as part of the early HIV/AIDS activism of the late 1980s and early 1990s. Examples of contemporary detournement include Adbusters' "subvertisements" and other instances of culture jamming, as well as poems composed collaboratively by Marlene Mountain, Paul Conneally, and others, in which quotations from such famous sources as the Ten Commandments and quotations by United States President George W. Bush are combined with haiku-like phrases to produce a larger work intended to subvert the original source.  The comic artist Brad Neely's reinterpretation of Harry Potter, Wizard People, took Warner Bros.' first Harry Potter film, The Sorcerer's Stone, and substituted the original soundtrack with a narration that casts the hero as a Nietzschean superman.

The concept of détournement has had a popular influence amongst contemporary radicals, and the technique can be seen in action in the present day when looking at the work of Culture Jammers including the Cacophony Society, Billboard Liberation Front, monochrom, Occupy Movements and Adbusters, whose "subvertisements" "detourn" Nike adverts, for example. In this case, the original advertisement's imagery is altered in order to draw attention to said company's policy of shifting their production base to cheap-labour third-world "free trade zones". However, the line between "recuperation" and "détournement" can become thin (or at least very fuzzy) at times, as Naomi Klein points out in her book No Logo. Here she details how corporations such as Nike, Pepsi or Diesel have approached Culture Jammers and Adbusters and offered them lucrative contracts in return for partaking in "ironic" promotional campaigns. She points out further irony by drawing attention to merchandising produced in order to promote Adbusters' Buy Nothing Day, an example of the recuperation of détournement if ever there was one.

Klein's arguments about irony reifying rather than breaking down power structures are echoed by Slavoj Žižek. Žižek argues that the kind of distance opened up by détournement is the condition of possibility for ideology to operate: by attacking and distancing oneself from the sign-systems of capital, the subject creates a fantasy of transgression that "covers up" their actual complicity with capitalism as an overarching system. In contrast, scholars are very fond of pointing out the differences between hypergraphics, "detournement", the postmodern idea of appropriation and the Neoist use of plagiarism as the use of different and similar techniques used for different and similar means, effects and causes.

The Neue Slowenische Kunst has a long history of aggressive détournement of extreme political ideologies, as do several industrial music groups, such as Die Krupps, Nitzer Ebb, KMFDM, and Front 242.

Chris Morris uses détournement and culture jamming extensively in his work, particularly in the British television series The Day Today and Brass Eye.

The Istanbul-based platform InEnArt, on the occasion of the 13th Istanbul Biennial 2013, launched  a forum titled Urban Voices focusing on phenomena that are turning expressions of the system and its media culture against itself. The authors of InEnArt regularly publish different phenomena of détournement and invite the online community to participate by uploading similar examples.

See also 
 Anti-art
 Culture jamming
 Comic strip switcheroo
 Doppelgänger brand image
 Dumb Starbucks
 Recuperation (politics)
 Scratch video
 Subvertising
 YouTube Poop
Brandalism

References

Further reading

External links 

Protest tactics
Anti-corporate activism
Humour
Psychogeography
Situationist International
Culture jamming techniques
Literary terminology
Derivative works